Kuritsino is a rural locality (a village) in Beketovskoye Rural Settlement, Vozhegodsky District, Vologda Oblast, Russia. The population was 34 as of 2002.

Geography 
The distance to Vozhega is 80 km, to Beketovskaya is 1 km. Nikulskaya, Kropufinskaya, Pokrovskaya, Andreyevskaya, Voskresenskoye, Zuyevo, Konechnaya, Filatovskaya are the nearest rural localities.

References 

Rural localities in Vozhegodsky District